Trščina is a small settlement in the Municipality of Sevnica in east-central Slovenia. It lies in the hills east of Mokronog and south of Tržišče. The area is part of the historical region of Lower Carniola. The municipality is now included in the Lower Sava Statistical Region.

References

External links
Trščina at Geopedia

Populated places in the Municipality of Sevnica